Proporus carolinensis is a species of acoel in the family Proporidae. It grows to a maximum length of 0.1 cm(or 1 mm). It lives in the western-central Atlantic (in areas near Belize and North Carolina), in sea sand, inlet areas, and subtidal areas.

References 

Animals described in 2004
Fauna of the Atlantic Ocean